Tara Donna Reid (born November 8, 1975) is an American actress. She played Vicky in the films American Pie (1999), American Pie 2 (2001), and American Reunion (2012), and Bunny Lebowski in The Big Lebowski (1998). In 2013, she starred as April Wexler in the television film Sharknado, and went on to reprise the role in five sequels (2013–2018).

Reid made her film debut in A Return to Salem's Lot in 1987. Her other film appearances include Urban Legend (1998), Dr. T & the Women (2000), Josie and the Pussycats (2001), Van Wilder (2002), My Boss's Daughter (2003), and Alone in the Dark (2005). She had her own reality travel show on the E! network called Taradise in 2005, and was a housemate on the 2011 British reality series Celebrity Big Brother 8, in which she placed 8th.

Early life
Tara Donna Reid was born and raised in Wyckoff, New Jersey, the daughter of Donna (née Bennett) and Thomas Reid, both of whom were teachers and day-care center owners. Her father also worked on Wall Street. She is of mainly Irish with some Scottish, Italian, French, Hungarian, and English descent. She attended Professional Children's School in Manhattan, along with fellow actors Christina Ricci, Jerry O'Connell, Sarah Michelle Gellar, Donald Faison and Macaulay Culkin. Reid has twin younger siblings, Colleen and Patrick, and another brother, Tom.

Career
Reid began acting at age six, becoming a regular on the game show Child's Play, and appeared in over 100 commercials for corporations including Jell-O, McDonald's, Crayola, and Milton Bradley. As a teenager, she was on Saved by the Bell: The New Class.

After moving to Hollywood in 1997, Reid transitioned to movies, landing her breakout role in 1998's The Big Lebowski. Though the film disappointed at the box office, grossing only $17 million in the US, it has gone on to become a cult classic. Later that same year, she appeared in a larger role in a more financially successful film, Urban Legend, where she portrayed a sexy radio host and which grossed just under $40 million in the US and led to two sequels, though neither included Reid. In 1999, she appeared in a tiny role in another hit, Cruel Intentions. Reid found her first taste of real mainstream success when she portrayed the role of the virginal Vickie in American Pie (1999), which grossed over $100 million in the US. The film also marked her first film to reach number one at the box office. In 2001, she reprised the role in American Pie 2, which opened to $45 million and grossed over $145 million in the US, almost 50% more than its predecessor. Reid did not return for American Wedding (2003), but did reprise the character in the fourth theatrical film in the series, American Reunion (2012).

Following the success of American Pie 2, Reid starred in a number of commercial and critical misfires, including Josie and the Pussycats and Van Wilder. She also starred as the youngest daughter of a Texas gynecologist in Robert Altman's Dr. T & the Women, alongside Richard Gere. She returned to the small screen as a recurring character on the NBC sitcom Scrubs, appearing in 11 episodes of season three. Shortly thereafter, Reid appeared alongside Ashton Kutcher in My Boss's Daughter, for which she was nominated for both Worst Supporting Actress and Worst Screen Couple at the 2004 Golden Raspberry Awards.

In 2005, she co-starred in infamous German filmmaker Uwe Boll's Alone in the Dark with Christian Slater. Her mispronunciation of "Newfoundland" became a popular Internet catchphrase. The film was panned by critics and Reid received a Razzie Award nomination for Worst Actress. Reid signed on to host the E!'s Wild On Tara Reid (later renamed Taradise), a program that showcased high-society vacations and hot spots. The show premiered on August 10, 2005, but it was cancelled in September, with Ted Harbert, E! Network's president, saying it was "incredibly difficult to produce with someone well-known."

In January 2007, Reid filmed a commercial with Daniel Conn for Dodo, an Australian budget telephone and Internet service provider. Between 2007 and 2008, she starred in a number of direct-to-video films, including 7-10 Split/Strike, If I Had Known I Was a Genius (which was released at the 2007 Sundance Film Festival), and Clean Break/Unnatural Causes. She also played the main character in the made-for-television horror film Vipers. In 2010, she landed the role of Bonnie in the thriller film The Fields, which was released in 2011. In March 2011, she filmed a Funny or Die spoof trailer for The Big Lebowski 2.

On August 18, 2011, Reid was the second housemate to enter the British reality series Celebrity Big Brother 8. On September 2, she received the fewest votes and became the third celebrity to be evicted from the house.

In September 2011, Reid announced via her official Twitter page that she was to appear in Jedward's new music video for "Wow Oh Wow", which they started shooting in late October of the same year. In 2014, she appeared in their music video for "Ferocious".

In 2013, she appeared in the hit Syfy film Sharknado which spawned five sequels in 2014, 2015, 2016, 2017, and 2018. Other projects Reid appeared in during the mid-2010s included comedy spoof The Hungover Games, horror film Charlie's Farm, the Bollywood film Tie the Knot, and the TV series The Big Big Show with Andrew Dice Clay and Tom Green.

In 2019, Reid guest-starred as herself in an episode of The Boys where she attended a comic convention with Billy Zane.

Other ventures 
Reid has appeared on the cover of numerous magazines, including CosmoGirl, Rolling Stone, Seventeen, Maxim, Playboy, Stuff, and FHM. She has appeared in television commercials for Jello, McDonald's, Dodo Australia, and Crayola.

In 2007, Reid had shares in three restaurants (Bella, Geisha House, and The Shore) and opened Ketchup, a fast-food restaurant based in Los Angeles.

Reid and Ed Hardy designer Christian Audigier designed Mantra, a clothing line that hit high-end department stores in 2009. In 2014, she released a new swimwear line and a perfume, Shark by Tara, inspired by the film franchise Sharknado.

Personal life

In October 2006, Reid acknowledged in an interview with Us Weekly that she had undergone liposculpting. In the interview, she discusses how her plastic surgery "went wrong" and also explains why she decided to have plastic surgery done, saying that her breasts were uneven and that she wanted a "sixpack" for a new movie role. The liposuction resulted in deformity. In the same interview, Reid's new plastic surgeon, Steven Svehlak, reported that he performed a procedure called a "doughnut mastopexy" to correct her original augmentation, and performed additional liposuction in hopes of evening out her abdomen.

Relationships
In March 2000, Reid met Carson Daly on the set of Total Request Live and they began dating. They shared an apartment in New York City and Daly proposed on October 29 2000. In June 2001, Reid and Daly broke off their engagement.

On January 18, 2010, Reid's boyfriend, Michael Axtmann, an Internet entrepreneur from Nuremberg, proposed to her at The Little Door restaurant in Los Angeles. The couple had reportedly planned an intimate ceremony for summer 2010. On April 20, it was reported that the wedding had been called off and the relationship had ended, with a representative stating: "Tara Reid has confirmed that she will not be moving forward with her May 22 nuptials."

In November 2010, Reid began dating Danish businessman Michael Lillelund. According to People, on August 14, 2011, Reid's spokesman reported that  she and Lillelund had married the day before in Greece. Lillelund denied it, saying he had not been in contact with Reid since February.

In August 2011, Reid publicized that she had married Bulgarian financier Zachary Kehayov. In October of that year, she announced that they were not legally married.

Between 2013 and 2014, Reid was dating Israeli musician Erez Eisen from the band Infected Mushroom.

In 2016, Reid and actor Dean May participated in Marriage Boot Camp: Reality Stars, but were rejected when they were revealed not to be in a relationship.

In 2017, Reid dated executive Ted Dhanik.

Filmography

Film

Television

References

External links

 
 
 

20th-century American actresses
21st-century American actresses
Actresses from New Jersey
American child actresses
American film actresses
American television actresses
American people of Dutch descent
American people of English descent
American people of Hungarian descent
American people of Irish descent
American people of Italian descent
American people of Scottish descent
Living people
People from Wyckoff, New Jersey
Ramapo High School (New Jersey) alumni
1975 births